Andrea María Velasco Alessandri (born December 7, 1981, in Santiago, Chile) is a Chilean film, theater and television actress and singer of Italian descent. She is well known for her work in romantic comedies, late night TV shows, and recently, her music career.

Early life and acting
An actress and professional singer, Velasco studied theatrical and musical arts in Chile and Argentina. During her career, she has worked in theatre, TV shows, cinema and radio.

She is best known for her character of Ángela de María in Nicolás López' "Qué Pena" trilogy, "Qué pena tu vida", "Qué pena tu boda" and "Qué pena tu familia", the highest-grossing movies in Chile in 2010, 2011 and 2013, respectively.

In 2011, she was chosen as one of the "100 Young Chilean Leaders" in Culture, an award given by the Strategic Leadership Center from Adolfo Ibáñez University and El Mercurio.

During 2013 she joined TVN's Entertainment department, participating in Solamente Julia with her antagonic role, Isabel Larraín, and then a year after as Denisse Moya in the late night thriller show Vuelve Temprano.

Until 2016, she was an active part of Televisión Nacional de Chile's entertainment department. Now Andrea is based in USA developing her career both in Chile and internationally.

Music career
As a break from her acting career, Velasco recorded her first project as a singer, "Piñata". The 5-song electro-pop EP sung in Spanish was recorded in RedCello Studios in Los Angeles, as a collaboration piece between Velasco, Jorge Costa, Diego Las Heras and Fernando Costa (Red Jesus). "Piñata" was edited and mixed by Diego Las Heras (Seek Music Production, Canada), in a joint production with RedCello.

Her first single, titled "De Paseo", was released in December 2014, with a full release in January 2015. That same year, Andrea was nominated as "Best New Artist" for her debut in the Pulsar Chilean Music Awards.

Other activities
Velasco is an active member of Greenpeace, having participated in campaigns to raise awareness about global warming.

She publishes her first book in May 2017 in Santiago de Chile, a contemporary poetry book entitled "Dormancia".

Filmography

Movies

Soap operas

TV Shows

Theatre 
 Twelfth Night by Shakespeare (2005) as Feste. Santiago, Chile.
 Ubu Roi (2006) by Alfred Jarry, as Mama Ubu. Santiago, Chile.
 The Little Prince (play) (2008) by Antoine de Saint-Exupéry, as "The Little Prince". Santiago, Chile.
 "El Sobre Azul" (2009) writer and director, winner of the National Fund for the Development of Culture and the Arts (FONDART) Santiago, Chile.
 Patio (2011) as Victoria, Compañía de Teatro "La Nuestra", Festival Internacional de Teatro de Providencia (Chile).
 Los Invasores (2012) by Egon Wolff, as Marcela, winner of the National Fund for the Development of Culture and the Arts (FONDART). Santiago, Chile.
 "Verano Verano" by Myrna Casas (2018) as Adriana. Direction by Jorge Merced, production by IATI Theater. New York, USA.

Music 
 Lead singer, Contrabando 2005 – 2006
 Lead singer, music and lyrics Pasajeros 2008 – 2009 with Fernando Marín
 Lead singer, Andrea Velasco Cuarteto 2008 – 2010
 Backup singer, Yo Soy Pérez 2009 – 2010 
 Lead singer, lyrics and co-production of her first EP, "Piñata" 2015
 Lead singer, lyrics and co-production of her first English single, "Miss América" 2019
 Lead singer, lyrics and co-production of her single, "The Wave" 2020
 Lead singer, lyrics and co-production of her single, "Retornar" 2022

Discography 

Studio Albums
 2015: "Piñata"

Singles
2014: "De Paseo"
2019: "Miss América"
2020: "The Wave"
2022: "Retornar"

Collaborations & Remixes
 2013: "Rey del Kazoo", red jesus
 2016: "Take your time", Zebra 93
 2016: "Side by side", Zebra 93
 2016: "Take your time", Zebra (Virtual Memory Virus Remix)
 2021: "Go tell it on the mountain", Merry Pinchmas by Pinch Records

Awards 
 "Merit Diploma" for her outstanding achievements in Finis Terrae University's Drama School. (2001) 
 Winner playwright in the IV Short Playwriting Contest with "Crucidrama" (2003)
 Honorable Mention, XIII National Playwriting Contest with "El Sobre Azul" (2007)
 Winner, National Fund for the Development of Culture and the Arts FONDART (2009)
 Named Leader in Culture among the "100 Young Chilean Leaders" (2011) by Strategic Leadership Center from Adolfo Ibáñez University and El Mercurio.
 Nominated as Best Actress in a Feature Film for her role in "Qué Pena Tu Boda", Altazor Awards (2012)
 Nominated as Best New Artist for her single "De Paseo" from her debut EP "Piñata". Pulsar Chilean Music Awards, (2015)
 Best Comedy Film winner with "Lo Siento Laura" movie, Texas Latin Film Festival (Festival de Cine Latino Americano FDCLA) USA (2016)
 Best Short Film winner with "Desde El Principio" by Miguel J. Soliman. SVA 2017 Short Film Festival, New York, USA. (2017)
 Best Actress in a Short Film winner for her role in "Desde El Principio" by Miguel J. Soliman. The Westfield International Film Festival, New Jersey, USA. (2017)
 Best Short Film winner with "Desde El Principio" by Miguel J. Soliman. HBO NYLFF, HBO New York Latino Film Festival, New York, USA.(2017)

External links 
 Official Site
 
 Official Facebook Page
 Official Soundcloud

References

1981 births
Chilean television actresses
Chilean film actresses
Chilean telenovela actresses
Chilean people of Italian descent
Living people
Actresses from Santiago
21st-century Chilean actresses
21st-century Chilean women singers